Mabel and Fatty's Married Life is a 1915 American short comedy film directed by and starring Fatty Arbuckle.

Plot
While Fatty's out on business Mabel stays alone at home. She hears noises and thinks there is a burglar. She calls the Keystone Cops for help, but it turns out it was a small monkey belonging to an organ grinder. Fatty comes home and they laugh about what has happened.

Cast
 Mabel Normand as Mabel
 Roscoe 'Fatty' Arbuckle as Fatty, her husband
 Al St. John as Cop
 Joe Bordeaux as Second Italian / Cop
 Josef Swickard
 Mae Busch (uncredited)
 Alice Davenport as Woman (uncredited)
 Alice Howell as Woman (uncredited)
 Charles Lakin as Fatty's Business Associate (uncredited)

See also
 Fatty Arbuckle filmography

References

External links

1915 films
1915 comedy films
1915 short films
Silent American comedy films
American black-and-white films
Films directed by Roscoe Arbuckle
American silent short films
American comedy short films
1910s American films
1910s English-language films